When Fish Ride Bicycles is the debut studio album by American hip hop duo The Cool Kids. Released on July 12, 2011 under Green Label Sound Records, this would also be their 2nd & final release under a major label. The album features the collaborations production, from Chuck Inglish (one half of the duo), The Neptunes, and Travis Barker, along with appearances from Bun B, Ghostface Killah, Travis Barker, and Asher Roth. This is the first studio recording of the group after the mixtape Tacklebox, in the beginning of 2010. The song Swimsuits is used on a Mountain Dew Commercial.

Development 
When Fish Ride Bicycles was announced to be 92% complete on February 16, 2009 by Chuck Inglish on their blog. Numerous delays kept pushing the album back and a majority of the original material was released on the Gone Fishing and Tackclebox mixtapes.

Reception 
When Fish Ride Bicycles received generally positive reviews from music critics. At Metacritic, which assigns a weighted mean rating out of 100 to reviews from mainstream critics, the album received an average score of 75, based on 21 reviews, which indicates "generally favorable reviews." The album title was a trending topic on Twitter.

Track listing 

Notes
 The CD and Vinyl version feature 3 extra songs: 'Freak City', 'Flying Kites', and 'Talk Of The Town'. The tracklist on this version has a different track order.

References 

2011 albums
Albums produced by Chuck Inglish
Albums produced by the Neptunes
The Cool Kids albums